Babylon South is a 1989 novel from Australian author Jon Cleary. It was the sixth book featuring Sydney homicide detective Scobie Malone, and deals with Malone coming across an old case of his - the 1966 disappearance of the head of ASIO. He also has to investigate another murder, and deal with pressure from the police commissioner.

References

External links
Babylon South at AustLit (subscription required)

1989 Australian novels
Novels set in Sydney
William Collins, Sons books
William Morrow and Company books
Novels by Jon Cleary